Kala Keerthi Sunanda Mahendra De Mel (born 28 January 1938), popularly known as Sunanda Mahendra, is an author, theater director, poet and Sinhala Radio Play writer in Sri Lanka.

Currently, he is a regular contributor to the Sinhala and English Press in Sri Lanka.

Personal life
Mahendra was born on 28 January 1938 in Piliyandala as the third of the family with five siblings. His father Martin Henry De Melwas was a Public Health Inspector by profession. His mother, Lilliat Magaret Waidyaratne was a housewife. His younger brother died in younger age. He started primary education from Dharmaraja College, Kandy. Then he attended to Ananda College, Colombo to complete studies from English medium. His classmates at the school are, J. B. Disanayake, D.B. Nihalsinghe, Bandara Wijethunga, Asoka Ponnamperuma and Wijeratne Warakagoda.

Academic career
After passing senior examination, Mahendra attended to Vidyalankara Pirivena (currently known as University of Kelaniya) and obtained BA degree. After He was a visiting fellow in Mass communication attached to the University of Leicester. After London visit, he returned Sri Lanka and worked as a visiting lecturer at Kelaniya University. In 1987, Mahendra went Poland to study folklore from University of Wroclaw where he obtained an honorary doctorate. Later in 1990s, he held the emeritus professorship at the University of Kelaniya, Sri Lanka.

In 1987, he served as the Secretary Treasurer, National Chapter of Commonwealth Association for Education of Journalism and Communication (CAEJAC), Sri Lanka, where he later became the vice president as well. He was a visiting Lecturer at Jaffna University from 1973 to 1977.

Career
He started to write news columns which were published in daily and weekly papers. He published the drama book Vineetha Hema becoming the first to publish a drama associated book in Sri Lanka. He published his maiden novel Hewaneli Eda Minissu which won State Literary Award for the best novel in 1964. In 1965, he translated Henrik Ibsen’s play Heddar Gabler as Geheniyak to Sinhala. During this period, he became a program producer in Radio Ceylon. Then he became a professional broadcaster on the BBC World Service, based in London, where he also read for his doctorate. He is the pioneer to bring BBC Sandeshaya to Sri Lankan listeners. In 1965, a monologue called Pitastharayo was produced which was originally a radio drama. His next stage play was Sayuren Aa Landa in 1967 starred by Malini Fonseka.

He wrote popular song lyrics for C.T. Fernando such as "Obage Thurulen Oba Dun Sihilen" and "Amathannata Heki Basak Soya". However the songs were released through radio after the death of Fernando in 1977. While in UK, he wrote the song "Kuda Devika" sung by Edmond Wickremasekera. In 1976, Mahendra made the play Jana Hathura. In 1979, he made the first autonomous play Pokuru Wessa. Later Wilson Gunaratne produced the remake of the play.

In 1980, he made several children’s and media books. In the meantime, he presented the popular radio program Vishwa Keerthiyata Pathwuuwo. The program involved many foreign personalities such as Darwin, Socrates, Dickens, Plato, D H Lawrence, Beethoven, Checkov, Gallileo, Homer which were discussed under socio-political frame work. Apart from that, he also presented the programs Geeyaka Rasa, Nirmana Vindana and Sahan Eliya. After his return from Poland to Sri Lanka, he published a book on Polish folk tales, Polantha Janakatha.

In 1990, Mahendra produced the biopic stage play Socrates. Since then, he became a full-time writer and made the newspaper series Second thoughts on Daily News. The series was later published as a book by the same name. In 1999, he made the plays Aesop and Checkhov Sandhyava.

Notable works

Stage dramas
 Aesop
 Checkhov Sandhyava
 Geheniyak
 Guvan Viduli Natya Hathak
 Jana Hathura
 Ohuge Lokaya
 Pokuru Vessa
 Socrates

Novels
 Chaya Pranthaya
 Eya Mese Siduviya
 Guruvarayekuge Katava
 Hevaneli Eda Minissu
 Idoraya
 Kala Mekulu Hamba Enduna
 Nirlambanaya
 Niruwath Devivaru
 Numba Nadan
 Rajadrohiyekuge Katava
 Salalekuge Gitaya
 Uda Gedara Mahatmiyage Kathava
 Unu Alupalla
 Valmiki Obata Kive Sitha
 The Wayfarer

Poetry
 Ama Vila Dutu Pipasithaya
 An Inner Eye
 Asal Vesiyo Golu Vuha
 Divas Hula
 Ethera Kavi Esura
 Ethera methera Kurutu
 Jivaka Vatha
 Ogha Tharanaya
 Pavuru Valalla

Short stories
 Birinda Saha Mithuriya
 Dora Kavulu Erala
 Heta Sundara Davasaki
 Rathu Lantheruma
 Sittarage Puthraya

Awards
His book Ogha Tharanaya (The Crossing of the Torrential Stream) won the State Literary Award for the best Sinhala poetry collection in 2006. Many poems from the collection are now translated into English. He has won the State Literary Award for the best original play script (1993), the best research work (2002) and twice for the best Sinhala novels in 1964 and 2002. His outstanding contribution to his field of expertise, mass communication, earned him a UNESCO Copernicus award for Social Sciences in 1983.  The play Socrates won eight awards including best state drama award in 1991.

 1964 "Hevaneli eda minissu" best Sinhala Novel State Literary Award.
 1990 Most outstanding Citizen Award. Lions International.
 1992 "Socrates" best playscript State Literary Award
 1993 "Socrates" eight awards State Drama Festival
 2001 "Janakiyaman potha" best research State Literary Award
 2002 "Niruwath Devivaru" best Sinhala Novel State Literary Award
 2003 "Puranokthi Sangrahaya" merit State Literary Award
 2004 "Chaya Pranthaya" best Sinhala Novel Godage Literary Award
 2006 "Ogha Tharanaya" Best poetry collection State Literary Festival
 2010 Professor Gunapala Malalasekara Memorial Award for life-time achievement of Buddhist literary contribution.
 2008 Suta Kavi Buddhist Literary Award for Poetry

References

External links
Review on Sunanda Mahendra's first play
University of Kelaniya
මේ තරම් සුන්දර ද බන්ධන...?

1938 births
Living people
Sinhalese academics
Alumni of Dharmaraja College
Alumni of Ananda College
Sri Lankan dramatists and playwrights
Sri Lankan radio writers
Academic staff of the University of Kelaniya
Kala Keerthi
Sri Lankan novelists
Sinhala-language poets
Sinhalese writers
20th-century novelists
20th-century poets
20th-century dramatists and playwrights
Alumni of the University of Leicester
Alumni of the University of Kelaniya